Orest Adamovich Kiprensky ( -) was a leading Russian portraitist in the Age of Romanticism. His most familiar work is probably his portrait of Alexander Pushkin (1827), which prompted the poet to remark that "the mirror flatters me".

Biography 

He was an illegitimate son of a landowner Alexey Dyakonov, hence his name, derived from Kypris, one of the Greek names for the goddess of love. He was raised in the family of Adam Shvalbe, a serf. Although Kiprensky was born a serf, he was released from the serfdom upon his birth and later his father helped him to enter a boarding school at the Imperial Academy of Arts in Saint Petersburg in 1788 (when Orest was only six years old).

He studied at the boarding school and the academy itself until 1803. He lived at the academy for three more years as a pensioner to fulfill requirements necessary to win the Major Gold medal. Winning the first prize for his work Prince Dmitri Donskoi after the Battle of Kulikovo (1805) enabled the young artist to go abroad to study art in Europe.

A year before his graduation, in 1804, he painted the portrait of Adam Shvalbe, his foster father (1804), which was a great success. The portrait so impressed his contemporaries, that later members of the Naples Academy of Arts took it for the painting by some Old Master – Rubens or van Dyck. Kiprensky had to ask the members of the Imperial Academy of Arts for letters supporting his authorship.

After that, Kiprensky lived in Moscow (1809), Tver 1811, Saint Petersburg 1812, in 1816–1822 he lived in Rome and Napoli. In Italy he met a local girl Anna Maria Falcucci (Mariucci), to whom he became attached. He bought her from her dissolute family and employed as his ward. On leaving Italy, he sent her to a Roman Catholic convent.

In 1828, Kiprensky came back to Italy, as he got a letter from his friend Samuil Galberg, informing him that they had lost track of Mariucci. Kiprensky found Mariucci, who had been transferred to another convent. In 1836 he eventually married her. He had to convert into Roman Catholicism from Russian Orthodoxy for this marriage to happen. He died by pneumonia in Rome later that year. He is buried in the church of Sant'Andrea delle Fratte.

Selected portraits

References

External links 

 Gallery of Kiprensky's works

1782 births
1836 deaths
People from Kingiseppsky District
People from Yamburgsky Uyezd
Russian Roman Catholics
Converts to Roman Catholicism from Eastern Orthodoxy
Former Russian Orthodox Christians
Russian portrait painters
19th-century painters from the Russian Empire
Russian male painters
Russian romantic painters
Imperial Academy of Arts alumni
19th-century male artists from the Russian Empire